Givi can refer to:

Kivi, Iran, a city in Iran
Givi Amilakhvari, 18th century Georgian nobleman
Italian motorcycle accessory company, pronounced ‘Jee Vee’, founded by former Grand Prix motorcycle road racer Giuseppe Visenzi
Mikhail Tolstykh, nicknamed Givi, Donbas military commander